This is a list of Iranian Twenty20 International cricketers.

In April 2018, the ICC decided to grant full Twenty20 International (T20I) status to all its members. Therefore, all Twenty20 matches played between Iran and other ICC members after 1 January 2019 will have T20I status. Iran's first T20I was played against the UAE on 23 February 2020 during the 2020 ACC Western Region T20.

This list comprises all members of the Iran cricket team who have played at least one T20I match. It is initially arranged in the order in which each player won his first Twenty20 cap. Where more than one player won his first Twenty20 cap in the same match, those players are listed alphabetically by surname.

Key

List of players
Statistics are correct as of 25 February 2020.

References 

Iran